Hearts in Exile may refer to:

 Hearts in Exile (1915 film), an American film directed by James Young and starring Clara Kimball Young
 Hearts in Exile (1929 film), an American romance film directed by Michael Curtiz and starring Dolores Costello